The Coronation Stakes was a greyhound racing competition held annually at Wembley Stadium. It was inaugurated in 1928, one of the earliest competitions in greyhound racing. The race was one of the premier bitches only event in the UK greyhound calendar.

The competition came to an end following the closure of the Wembley Greyhounds by the Greyhound Racing Association and the sale of the stadium by their parent company Wembley plc.

Past winners

Venues & Distances
1928–1974 (Wembley 500 yards)
1975–1994 (Wembley 490 metres)

References

Greyhound racing competitions in the United Kingdom
Recurring sporting events established in 1928
Events at Wembley Stadium
Sport in the London Borough of Brent
Greyhound racing in London